The Stony Creek Brewery is a craft brewery established in 2010 by Manny Rodriguez and Peggy Crowley, located in Branford, Connecticut. Until 2012, the company produced only a small number of craft brews through a larger company, Thomas Hooker Brewery. That year, Ed Crowley, husband of co-founder Peggy Crowley, began pursuing an increase in craft brewing. Over the next three years, he re-branded Stony Creek Brewery and reopened in February 2015.

History

Contract production (2010–2012) 
Prior to their re-branding, Stony Creek Brewery was a small-scale contract-produced craft brand. As a small-scale craft brand without a brewery of their own, Stony Creek had minimal options for expansion. Eventually, Crowley saw the shift in market share from large core brands to small, local craft brews, saying "I started seeing some of the more local brands coming in and taking a half a point of market share. I would sit back in my chair as an A-B [Anheuser-Busch] guy or a Heineken guy would say 'I am losing taps to local brands.' ... Dichello's core brands started to suffer and, at that point, my family and I decided that 2012 was the proper time to get out." He sold his shares of Dichello Distributors (50% of total shares) to get start up money for the re-branding of Stony Creek Brewery.

Re-brand (2012–present) 
Crowley worked to re-brand Stony Creek. He began by bringing in his son Ed Crowly Jr. as owner. Next, Ed Crowley Sr. worked with his former business colleague Andrew Schwartz to design the job description for the Brewmaster at Stony Creek—a job Schwartz eventually took himself. Jamal Robinson was then acquired by Crowley from Blue Point Brewing Company to become Stony Creek's Director of Sales. Finally, Crowley brought in Michael Kiser, a brand strategist. Kiser worked with Crowley to create a visual brand.

The re-branded Stony Creek Brewery opened its first facility in Branford, Connecticut in February 2015. The Indian Neck facility took four years of planning and 10 months of construction to complete. The brewery's 30,000 square feet makes it the second largest brewing facility and taproom in Connecticut, trailing only Two Roads Brewing Company in Stratford, Connecticut. There is a 2,500 square foot tasting room. According to BrewBound.com, the Stony Creek Brewery produced "more than 10,000 barrels during its first 12 months."

Products

Active

Former

References

External links
 

Beer brewing companies based in Connecticut
Branford, Connecticut
Companies based in New Haven County, Connecticut
Drinking establishments in Connecticut